Digital Cybercherries Ltd. is a video game developer based in the United Kingdom. The studio was founded in 2015 by a group of close friends who shared the belief that the players are integral to the creation of their games. They have developed and released two video games: New Retro Arcade: Neon and Hypercharge: Unboxed.

The studio's first game, New Retro Arcade: Neon, was released independently on 1 August 2016. It was met with favourable reception and won VRDB's Players Choice VR of the Year 2016 award.

Their second game, Hypercharge: Unboxed, was released for Microsoft Windows via Steam Early Access on 22 June 2017. After being released on the Nintendo Switch in February 2020, it became available for Windows via Steam in June 2020.

The team includes Joe Henson (Public Relations and Marketing Manager), Dec Doyle (Lead Programmer and Game Designer), and Ulrich Gollick (Lead Audio Engineer and Game Designer).

Games developed

References

External links 
 

British companies established in 2015
Video game companies of the United Kingdom
Video game companies established in 2015
Video game development companies